"Dress" (ドレス) is the seventh single released by the Japanese rock band Buck Tick, released on May 21, 1993. It reached number 5 on the Oricon Chart. It was later re-released in 2005 and used as the opening theme for the Trinity Blood anime and this version ranked 24th on Oricon.

Track listing

Musicians

Atsushi Sakurai - Voice
Hisashi Imai - Guitar
Hidehiko Hoshino - Guitar
Yutaka Higuchi - Bass
Toll Yagami - Drums

References

External links
 

1993 singles
Buck-Tick songs
Anime songs
1993 songs
Victor Entertainment singles
Songs with lyrics by Atsushi Sakurai
Songs with music by Hidehiko Hoshino